Nikolai Feodosiyevich Kostromskoy (Chaleyev) (July 5, 1874 – November 3, 1938) was a Soviet and Russian stage actor, director and pedagogue. People's Artist of the RSFSR (1937).

Selected filmography 
 1919 — Polikushka
 1920 — Domestic Agitator

Awards and honors 

 Honored Artist of the RSFSR (1928)
 People's Artist of the RSFSR (1937)
 Order of the Red Banner of Labour (September 23, 1937)

References

External links 
 Николай Костромской on kino-teatr.ru

1874 births
1938 deaths
Male actors from Saint Petersburg
Theatre directors from Saint Petersburg
Honored Artists of the RSFSR
People's Artists of the RSFSR
Recipients of the Order of the Red Banner of Labour

Male actors from the Russian Empire
Theatre directors from the Russian Empire
Soviet drama teachers
Soviet male film actors
Soviet male stage actors
Soviet theatre directors
Burials at Novodevichy Cemetery